Victoria Padial Hernández (born August 10, 1988, in Granada) is a Spanish biathlete.

Padial competed in the 2010 Winter Olympics for Spain. Her best performance was 86th in the individual. She also finished 87th in the sprint.

As of February 2013, her best performance at the Biathlon World Championships is 45th, in the 2013 sprint.

As of February 2013, Padial's best performance in a Biathlon World Cup event is 40th, in the individual at Sochi in 2012/13. She subsequently bettered this in the 2013/14 season when she scored a 20th place in a sprint competition in Pokljuka.

On February 1, 2014, with her silver medal in the 7.5 km sprint, she became the first Spanish biathlete to win a medal in a European Championships. The following day, she won the silver medal in the 10 km pursuit too.

Padial competed in the 2014 Winter Olympics for Spain. Her best performance was 46th in the pursuit. She also finished 52nd in the sprint and 54th in the individual.

Olympic results

References 

1988 births
Biathletes at the 2010 Winter Olympics
Biathletes at the 2014 Winter Olympics
Spanish female biathletes
Living people
Olympic biathletes of Spain
Sportspeople from Granada
Competitors at the 2015 Winter Universiade